Karl Pribram or Přibram may refer to:

Karl Přibram (1877–1973), Austrian-born economist
Karl H. Pribram (1919–2015), Austrian-born neurosurgeon and theorist of cognition

See also 
 (1878–1973), Austrian physicist